Todd Holoubek (born September 10, 1969) is an American comedian, actor, and writer.

Education and academic career
He is an alumnus and an adjunct-faculty member of the Interactive Telecommunications Program at the Tisch School of the Arts of New York University in New York City. He is also a former NYU-resident researcher.

Career
Holoubek has made appearances in several film and television productions.  His most notable work is acting in and writing for The State (1993–1995), a sketch-comedy television series on the MTV television channel.

Holoubek performed in smaller shows after The State and joined the troupe in 2009 for two live reunion shows.

Todd is part of the Holoubek T-shirt family

External links

1969 births
American male comedians
21st-century American comedians
American male film actors
American male television actors
American television writers
American male television writers
Living people
Tisch School of the Arts alumni
Place of birth missing (living people)